Imani Ariana Morlock (born 14 June 1997) is a Puerto Rican footballer who plays as a defender for Puerto Rico Sol FC and the Puerto Rico women's national team.

Early life

Morlock attended Rio Rancho High School and played youth soccer for New Mexico Rush Soccer Club. She majored in kinesiology at Midwestern State University.

Club career

Racing Aprilia

In October 2020, Morlock signed with Serie C side F.C. Aprilia Racing Club.

International career

In March 2021, Morlock accepted a call-up to the Puerto Rico women's national team.

References

1997 births
Living people
Women's association football defenders
American women's soccer players
American sportspeople of Puerto Rican descent
American expatriate women's soccer players
American expatriate sportspeople in Italy
Expatriate women's footballers in Italy
Puerto Rican women's footballers
Puerto Rico women's international footballers
Soccer players from New Mexico
People from Rio Rancho, New Mexico
Sportspeople from Bernalillo County, New Mexico